Little Brak River is a settlement in Garden Route District Municipality in the Western Cape province of South Africa.

A seaside resort and town at the mouth of the Little Brak River from which it takes its name.  Little Brak River lies on the famous Garden Route, approximately 13km north of Mossel Bay. The form Klein-Brakrivier is preferred for official use.

References

Populated places in the Mossel Bay Local Municipality